Badin Lake is one of a series of lakes created by the damming of the Yadkin-Pee Dee River in the Uwharrie Lakes Region of the United States. The Badin Lake Dam was built in 1917 to support local aluminum smelting plant, Alcoa, and the associated community of Badin was named for the founder, Adrien Badin. The power generation unit was sold to Cube Hydro Carolinas in February 2017. Badin Lake is in the Piedmont area of North Carolina. It is contained by Narrows Dam at the town of Badin, North Carolina. Sitting within a valley, the lake is very deep, with a maximum depth of 190 ft (58 m). The lake occupies  and has 115 mi (185 km) of shoreline. Its waters have an average summer temperature of 84.4 °F (29.1 °C) and an average winter temperature of 50.6 °F (10.3 °C). No ferries cross Badin Lake. The lake lies within Stanly, Davidson, Montgomery, and Rowan counties. Much of the lake's eastern shoreline lies within the Uwharrie National Forest.

Recreation 

Badin Lake offers both residents and visitors a wide range of recreational opportunities such as golf, fishing, boating, hiking, camping, and hunting.

Badin Lake has many game fish, including Largemouth Bass, Crappie, Catfish, Spotted Bass, White Bass, and Striped Bass. There are no Trout in Badin Lake.

1944 Plane Crash 

Quoting from the abstract of the U.S. Navy's publication on one of their historic aircraft wrecks:

Gallery

See also 

 Narrows Dam and Power Plant Complex
 Uwharrie National Forest
 High Rock Lake
 Yadkin-Pee Dee River Basin
 Lake Tillery

References

External links 

 uwharriepoint.com - Badin Lake information
 

Protected areas of Davidson County, North Carolina
Protected areas of Montgomery County, North Carolina
Protected areas of Rowan County, North Carolina
Protected areas of Stanly County, North Carolina
Reservoirs in North Carolina
Dams in North Carolina
Alcoa Power Generating dams
Yadkin-Pee Dee River Basin
Bodies of water of Davidson County, North Carolina
Bodies of water of Montgomery County, North Carolina
Bodies of water of Rowan County, North Carolina
Bodies of water of Stanly County, North Carolina